Farish Carter Tate (November 20, 1856 – February 7, 1922) was an American attorney and politician who served as a member of the United States House of Representatives for Georgia's 9th congressional district from 1893 to 1905.

Early life and education 
Tate was born in Jasper, Georgia, in 1856. He attended North Georgia Agricultural College in Dahlonega. He studied law, gained admittance to the state bar in 1880 and became a practicing attorney in Jasper.

Career 
In 1882, Tate was elected to the Georgia House of Representatives, and he served in that body until 1897. During that time, he also served on the Democratic State Executive Committee from 1884 through 1887. He served on that same committee again from 1890 to 1892. In addition, he served as a delegate to the 1888 Georgia Democratic Convention.

After to Georgia's 9th congressional district in the 53rd United States Congress, Tate was re-elected to five additional terms in that seat until losing his bid for reelection to the 59th Congress in 1904. In total, his federal congressional service spanned from March 4, 1893, through March 3, 1905.

After being appointed as a United States attorney in the Northern District of Georgia by President Theodore Roosevelt in 1905, Tate was reappointed to that position by President Howard Taft and served in that post until 1913. He then returned to Jasper to continue practicing law.

Personal life 
Tate died in Jasper on February 7, 1922, and was buried in the Tate family cemetery.

External links

1856 births
1922 deaths
Democratic Party members of the Georgia House of Representatives
Georgia (U.S. state) lawyers
Democratic Party members of the United States House of Representatives from Georgia (U.S. state)
People from Jasper, Georgia
United States Attorneys for the Northern District of Georgia
19th-century American lawyers